Three is a 2002 anthology horror film collaboration consisting of three omnibus segments by directors from three Asian countries. The segments are, in the following order:
Memories, directed by Kim Jee-woon (South Korea) - dialogue in Korean
The Wheel, directed by Nonzee Nimibutr (Thailand) - dialogue in Thai
Going Home, directed by Peter Chan (Hong Kong) - dialogue in Cantonese and Mandarin

A sequel, Three... Extremes, was released in 2004 following the same concept but with different directors: Fruit Chan, Takashi Miike and Park Chan-wook. The original film was released in America as Three... Extremes II to capitalize on the success of the sequel.

Memories
Directed and screenplay by Kim Jee-woon
Cinematography by Hong Kyung-pyo
A man goes to a psychiatrist to try to remember what happened the day his wife disappeared from his life. Meanwhile, his wife wakes up and finds herself lying on a deserted road, having no idea how she got there in the first place. Slowly, she recollects the memories of her previous life and takes a lead towards her and her husband's residence, a flat located in an empty housing estate called "New Town". Strange things befall on the couple: the husband experiences nightmares of his ghastly wife mutilating herself, while the wife feels as if others do not acknowledge her existence. When she finally arrives at her residence, she discovers the full truth.

The man had murdered his wife after an argument and cut her into pieces. Her remains are then stored in a black bag seen at certain points in the movie. The man experiences trauma after the incident, while the reason why others ignore the wife is because no one can see her. The man is then seen driving away from New Town with his wife's remains.

Cast
Jeong Bo-seok - Husband 
Kim Hye-soo -  Wife
Choi Jeong-won - Doctor 
Jang Jung-won - Eun-Ji
Jee Sung-keun - Taxi driver
Moon Jung-hee - Hyun-joo, the sister of the wife
Park Hee-soon - Hyun-joo's husband

The Wheel
Directed by Nonzee Nimibutr
Story by: Ek Iemchuen and Nonzee Nimibutr
Screenplay by Nitas Singhamat
Cinematography by Nattawut Kittikhun
A puppet master (known as Hun lakhon lek) named Master Tao lies dying in his bed after he has drowned his wife and son. Tao fears of a curse coming from his puppets, which will exact their improper owners misery should they take hold of them. He is later burned alive inside his house with the spirits of his wife and son becoming witnesses. His rival, Master Tong, a tutor for traditional Thai dance connected to Hun lakhon lek (known as Khon) attempts to steal the puppets to raise his prestige. However, this causes deaths of many people in the troupe. Tong eventually meets the same fate as Tao when the house he is in catches flames and burns down.

Cast
Suwinit Panjamawat - Gaan 
Kanyavae Chatiawaipreacha - Nuan
Pornchai Chuvanon - Plew
Anusak Intasorn - Im
Pattama Jangjarut - Nan
Savika Kanchanamas - Sa-Ing
Manop Meejamarat - Cht
Tinnapob Seeweesriruth - Dang
Vinn Vasinanon - Bua
Pongsanart Vinsiri - Master Tong
Komgrich Yuttiyong - Master Tao

Going Home

Directed by Peter Chan
Story by Teddy Chan and Su Chao-Bin
Screenplay by Matt Chow and Jo Jo Hui Yuet-chun
Cinematography by Christopher Doyle
Filming location: Former Police Married Quarters on Hollywood Road, Sheung Wan, Hong Kong
A widowed cop, Chan Kwok-wai moves to a dying apartment with his son, Cheung. He is informed about Yu, a neighbor across the complex, who lives with his paralyzed wife, Hai'er, and daughter. Yu's daughter creeps Cheung, but the two become friends and later play at a photo studio. However, Chan mistakenly believes that Yu has kidnapped Cheung and attempts to break into his apartment, only to get caught and rendered unconscious. Yu takes Chan hostage and reveals that his wife has died, yet he continues to talk to her as if she is alive. He promises to release him in three days, the time when his wife would "wake up" through the help of Chinese medicine, after which the two would go back to their Changsha home in the mainland. He also reveals that he never has a daughter, for she was aborted when his wife succumbed to liver cancer three years before.

On the third day, Chan's fellow cops manage to arrest Yu. However, before he is taken away, he escapes and attempts to reach Hai'er, only to get killed when a car hits him. The doctor who treated Yu and Hai'er tell Chan the full truth about her patients as well as the fact that though Hai'er has died, she does indeed shows signs of life. The film ends with Cheung leaving the photo studio, which is shown to be closed from the outside but thriving in the inside, implying that it is otherworldly. Yu, Hai'er, and their daughter enter the studio to get their photos taken.

Cast
Leon Lai - Yu 
Eric Tsang - Chan Kwok-wai 
Eugenia Yuan - Hai'er, Yu's wife
Li Ting-Fung - Cheung
Lau Tsz-Wing - Yu's Daughter
Camy Ting - Pathologist
Ting Tak-Ming - Janitor
Wong Heng - Doctor
John Shum - Photographer

Release
Three was first released in theaters on July 12, 2002. In the Philippines, the film was released by Solar Entertainment on October 13, 2004.

The film was released in the United States under the title Three Extremes II, as the sequel was released first in U.S. territories, followed by this film.

Accolades
The third segment of the film, Going Home, has won:
2002 Golden Horse Film Festival:
Best Actor: Leon Lai
Best Cinematography: Christopher Doyle
2003 Hong Kong Film Awards:
Best New Performer: Eugenia Yuan

References

External links

2002 films
2000s Korean-language films
2000s Mandarin-language films
2000s supernatural horror films
2002 horror films
Cantonese-language films
Films directed by Kim Jee-woon
Films directed by Peter Chan
Hong Kong psychological horror films
South Korean horror anthology films
South Korean psychological horror films
Thai horror films
Thai psychological horror films
Thai-language films
2000s South Korean films
2000s Hong Kong films
Thai horror anthology films